Modi'in Central railway station (Tahanat HaRakevet Modi'in Merkaz) is an Israel Railways passenger terminal and one of two stations serving Modi'in (the other being Paatei Modi'in). It is the terminus of the Nahariya-Modi'in line, with service to the airport, Tel Aviv, Haifa, and Akko. It became operational on April 1st, 2008. On March 31, 2022, an electric link to Jerusalem was established.

Modi'in Central is the first rail station in Israel that is completely underground.

Gallery

References

External links 
Modi'in Central railway station, on Israel Railways website

Railway stations in Central District (Israel)
Railway stations opened in 2008
Modi'in-Maccabim-Re'ut
2008 establishments in Israel
Railway stations located underground